The United States Air Force's 163d Combat Communications Group communications unit, headquartered in Sacramento, California, is one of eight Air National Guard Combat Communications Groups nationwide, which make up 80% of the U.S. Air Force tactical communications capability.  The 163d CCG is one of five major organizations that make up the California Air National Guard.  The 163d provides command, control, supervisory management, and training of four Combat Communications Squadrons, as well as administrative management of one Engineering Installation Squadron, one Intelligence Squadron, and one Space Operations Squadron.

History
The 163d's history goes back to the 599th Signal Aircraft Warning Battalion activated at Drew Field in Tampa, Florida on 30 March 1944. Shortly thereafter, the unit moved to Oahu, Hawaii. Some of its components saw action in the Marshall and Mariana Islands during World War II. The unit was inactivated on 29 July 1946, but was reactivated on 13 May 1948 as the 162nd Aircraft Control and Warning Group of the California Air National Guard.

On 1 May 1951 the unit mobilized to serve state side during the Korean War until its inactivation on 6 February 1952. The following year, it returned to the State of California and was re-designated the 162nd Tactical Control Group, stationed at Van Nuys Air National Guard Base.  At that time three of the presently assigned units (the 147th, 148th and 149th) were Aircraft Control and Warning Squadrons under the 162nd Group.

On 1 March 1961, the Group Headquarters moved to the North Highlands ANG Station in Sacramento, and was re-designated the 162nd Communications Group (Mobile).  By that time the 222nd, 234th, and 261st units had joined the Group.  In 1966 the Group was re-designated again, to the 162nd Mobile Communications Group.  This designation they kept until 10 February 1976, when they were given their present designation of 162nd Combat Communications Group.  The 162nd falls under the command of Air Force Air Combat Command at Langley AFB, Virginia.

Assignments

Major Command/Gaining Command
Air National Guard/Tactical Air Command (??? − 1 June 1992)
Air National Guard/Air Combat Command (1 June 1992 – present)

Combat Communications 163
Combat Communications 163
Military units and formations in California